26N may refer to:

 Ocean City Municipal Airport (New Jersey)'s FAA airport identification code
 26th parallel north, a line of latitude

See also
 N26 (disambiguation)